Adesmus phoebinus is a species of beetle in the family Cerambycidae. It was described by Per Olof Christopher Aurivillius in 1900. It is known from Venezuela.

References

Adesmus
Beetles described in 1900